Aurorobotys crassispinalis is a moth in the family Crambidae. It was described by Eugene G. Munroe and Akira Mutuura in 1971. It is found in Zhejiang, China.

References

Moths described in 1971
Pyraustinae
Moths of Asia